The following lists events that happened during 1856 in Chile.

Incumbents
President of Chile: Manuel Montt

Events 
date unknown - 1856 Argentina–Chile treaty

September
18 September - Chilean presidential election, 1856

Births
8 February - Alfredo Valenzuela Puelma (d. 1909)
11 May - Carlos Aldunate Solar (d. 1931)

Deaths
19 June - Ventura Blanco Encalada (b. 1782)

References 

 
1850s in Chile
Chile
Chile